SS J. H. Drummond was a Liberty ship built in the United States during World War II. She was named after James Hubert Drummond, the former mayor of St. Andrews, Florida, now part of Panama City, Florida.

Construction
J. H. Drummond was laid down on 25 May 1944, under a Maritime Commission (MARCOM) contract, MC hull 2309, by J.A. Jones Construction, Panama City, Florida; she was sponsored by Grace Edith Drummond, the widow of the namesake, and launched on 30 June 1944.

History
She was allocated to American Export Lines, Inc., on 20 July 1944. On 23 May 1946, she was laid up in the National Defense Reserve Fleet, in the Hudson River Group. On 25 July 1947, she was sold to the Netherlands, for commercial use. She was renamed Hugo de Groot and sailed under a Dutch flag until 1960, when she was sold to International Navigation Corp., and reflagged for Liberia, and renamed Severn River. On 25 July 1966, after having been sold to Cia Eleosa Nav., and reflagged for Panama, and renamed Angelic, she ran aground off Nojima Saki, Chiba, Japan, in fog. She was refloated but declared a constructive total loss (CTL) and later scrapped at Yokosuka, Japan.

References

Bibliography

 
 
 
 
 
 
 

 

Liberty ships
Ships built in Panama City, Florida
1944 ships
Hudson River Reserve Fleet
Maritime incidents in 1966